Love Is the Answer may refer to:

 "Love Is the Answer", 1975, a song by The Stylistics from The Best of the Stylistics Volume II
 "Love Is the Answer" (Utopia song), 1977, also covered by England Dan & John Ford Coley
"Love's the Answer", a song by Tanya Tucker
 Love Is the Answer (album), a 2009 album by Barbra Streisand
 Love Is the Answer: 24 Songs of Faith, Hope and Love, a 2004 album by Glen Campbell
 "Love Is the Answer" (Cedric Gervais song), 2011
 "Love Is the Answer", a song by Aloe Blacc from Wake Me Up

 "Love Is the Answer", a song by Funk Fanatics featuring Peyton, remixed by Freemasons 
 "Love Is the Answer", a song by Tina Arena from In Deep
 "Love Is the Answer", a song by Weezer from Raditude, also covered by Sugar Ray
 "Love Is the Answer", a song by Cerrone from Supernature (Cerrone III)